Dafydd ap Hwlcyn ap Madog was a 17th-century Welsh poet. He is known to have written 'cywydd' style verse, such as that transcribed by John Thomas in NLW manuscript 669D.

References 

17th-century Welsh poets
Welsh male poets
17th-century male writers